The Shot Calla is the debut studio album by American rapper D-Shot. It was released on June 7, 1993, through Sick Wid It Records, and was entirely produced by Studio Ton. The album peaked at 52 on the Top R&B/Hip-Hop Albums and 32 on the Top Heatseekers. "Call Me on the Under" was released as a single and had a music video shot for it, but it failed to make it to any of the Billboard charts.

Track listing
"Punk Ass Nigga"- 4:26 (Featuring E-40 and Mac Shawn) 
"Crooked Cops"- 5:18 (E-40 and B-Legit) 
"Wheels"- 3:35 (Featuring E-40 and Mugzi) 
"The Shot Loves to Fuck"- 4:23  
"When the Money Was Flowin'"- 4:16 (Featuring B-Legit)
"Cops Revisited"- 1:23  
"Call Me on the Under"- 4:50 (Featuring E-40) 
"You Ain't Shit"- 4:21 (Featuring Suga T) 
"Fuck a Ho"- 4:51 (Featuring B-Legit)
"Porno Star II"- 3:33 
"Typical Night"- 3:42  
"Player's Break"- 4:03

References

1993 debut albums
D-Shot albums
Albums produced by Studio Ton
Jive Records albums
Sick Wid It Records albums